Mind Exploding is the fifth album by German hard rock band Lucifer's Friend. This album marks the point where they returned to a more hard rock oriented style with less of a progressive rock sound. It is more or less the missing link between I'm Just a Rock & Roll Singer (1973) and Banquet (1974); with the hard rock driven sound of the former, it still has the occasional horn section and progressiveness of the latter. This is the last album with John Lawton on vocals before he joined Uriah Heep. Lawton returned to Lucifer's Friend in 1981 to record the Mean Machine album.

Track listing

Personnel
 John Lawton – lead vocals 
 Peter Hesslein – lead guitars, vocals
 Peter Hecht – keyboards
 Dieter Horns – bass guitar, vocals 
 Curt Cress – drums

References

External links
 

1976 albums
Lucifer's Friend albums